Marsala was a protected cruiser built by the Italian Regia Marina (Royal Navy) in the 1910s. Marsala spent World War I based at Brindisi; she was involved in the Battle of the Otranto Straits in May 1917, where she briefly engaged Austro-Hungarian cruisers. Marsalas career was cut short in November 1927 when she was stricken from the naval register and sold for scrap, the result of her unreliable engines and drastic cuts to the naval budget.

Design

She had a short forecastle deck and a pair of pole masts. Her crew consisted 13 officers and 283 enlisted men.

The ship's propulsion system consisted of three steam turbines, each driving a screw propeller. Steam was provided by fourteen mixed coal and oil firing Blechynden boilers, which were vented into four widely spaced funnels.

Marsala was armed with a main battery of six  L/50 guns mounted singly. She was also equipped with a secondary battery of six  L/50 guns, which provided close-range defense against torpedo boats. She also carried two  torpedo tubes submerged in the hull. Marsala also had a capacity to carry 200 naval mines.

Service history
Marsalas keel was laid down at the  shipyard on 15 February 1911, the same day as Nino Bixio. Work on Marsala proceeded slower than on her sister, and she was launched on 24 March 1912, where she was named for the city where Giuseppe Garibaldi launched the Expedition of the Thousand in 1860. After completing fitting-out work, the ship was commissioned into the Italian fleet on 4 August 1914. Marsala was thereafter assigned to the 1st Division of the 2nd Squadron; the squadron consisted of two divisions of armored cruisers, each supported by a scout cruiser.

Italy, a member of the Central Powers, declared neutrality at the start of World War I in August 1914, but by May 1915, the Triple Entente had convinced the Italians to enter the war against their former allies. Admiral Paolo Thaon di Revel, the Italian naval chief of staff, believed that Austro-Hungarian submarines could operate too effectively in the narrow waters of the Adriatic, which could also be easily seeded with minefields. The threat from these underwater weapons was too serious for him to use the fleet in an active way. Instead, Revel decided to implement a blockade at the relatively safer southern end of the Adriatic with the main fleet, while smaller vessels, such as the MAS boats, conducted raids on Austro-Hungarian ships and installations. Marsala, Nino Bixio, and the cruiser  were based at Brindisi during the war, where they could patrol the path from the narrow Adriatic to the Mediterranean.

By May 1917, the reconnaissance forces at Brindisi had come under the command of Rear Admiral Alfredo Acton. Marsala was the only Italian cruiser with steam up in her boilers when word of the Austro-Hungarian attack reached Brindisi. The British cruisers  and  departed first, along with five Italian destroyers. Marsala, the flotilla leader , and three destroyers followed thereafter, leaving Brindisi at around 8:30. They initially steamed east toward Valona before turning north to join Acton's forces pursuing the Austro-Hungarians. Marsala briefly engaged the fleeing Austro-Hungarians in the Battle of the Otranto Straits, before Acton temporarily broke off the pursuit. By around 11:00, Acton had seen Austro-Hungarian reinforcements steaming south, leading him to turn south with the two British cruisers to join Marsalas group. Having united his forces by around 11:30, Acton turned north once again to try to catch the damaged Novara, but half an hour later, the powerful armored cruiser  had reached the scene. Unable to engage the heavily armed vessel, Acton broke off again and returned to port.

Following the end of the war in November 1918, the Regia Marina demobilized; severely reduced naval budgets—the result of a weakened Italian economy in the early 1920s—led to further draw-downs. Marsalas engines were plagued with problems throughout her career, which made the ship an obvious target in the effort to trim the Regia Marinas budget. She was stricken from the naval register on 27 November 1927 and subsequently broken up for scrap.

Footnotes

Notes

Citations

References

Further reading

External links
 Marsala Marina Militare website 

Nino Bixio-class cruisers
1912 ships
Ships built in Castellammare di Stabia